Queens Arcade shopping centre is located in Cardiff city centre. It opened on 28 April 1994.

History

Developed on the site of the Allders department store and the similarly named Queen Street Arcade, the main entrance is located on Queen Street, and the second entrance faces Working Street near Cardiff Central Market.
The Arcade has two levels, and is unusual in that the levels are sloped, so that despite its two entrances being on the same level, the upper floor at the Working Street entrance is the ground floor at Queen Street. The centre internally connects with the St. David's Centre.

Queens Arcade recorded 11.2m annual footfall in 2012 and is anchored by New Look, Argos, Tim Hortons and Post Office. Four of Queens Arcade’s stores – Argos, Christopher George, F. Hinds and Whittard of Chelsea – have been in the centre from its launch and others from the opening year line up have changed their company names – such as Cookie Jar now Millie’s Cookies and Partners now Ryman.

In popular culture 
The original architecture was inspired by the many late 19th century arcades of Cardiff city centre and has appeared as the backdrop for various TV programmes, including the 2005 Doctor Who story "Rose", starring Christopher Eccleston and Billie Piper, which was set in London.

See also
 List of shopping arcades in Cardiff

References

External links
 
Queens Arcade official site

Shopping arcades in Cardiff
Buildings and structures completed in 1994
Castle, Cardiff
1994 establishments in Wales